Clarence Victor Shields (21 April 1914 – 21 June 1998) was an Australian rules footballer who played with Footscray, Collingwood and St Kilda in the Victorian Football League (VFL).

Notes

External links 

Clarrie Shields's profile at Collingwood Forever

1914 births
1998 deaths
Australian rules footballers from Melbourne
Western Bulldogs players
Collingwood Football Club players
St Kilda Football Club players
Camberwell Football Club players
People from Footscray, Victoria